London Calling: Live in Hyde Park is a concert video of Bruce Springsteen & the E Street Band's performance during the Hard Rock Calling music festival in Hyde Park, London on June 28, 2009. The film was released on DVD and Blu-ray formats by Columbia Records on June 22, 2010.

The work takes its name from the rendition of The Clash's "London Calling" that began the concert.  Performances of three songs from other shows on the tour are included as extras including one new song, "Wrecking Ball" which Springsteen wrote partially in response to the closing of Giants Stadium.

Contents
All songs written by Bruce Springsteen, except where noted.
"London Calling" (Joe Strummer, Mick Jones)
"Badlands"
"Night"
"She's the One"
"Outlaw Pete"  
"Out in the Street"
"Working on a Dream"
"Seeds"
"Johnny 99"
"Youngstown"
"Good Lovin'" (Rudy Clark, Arthur Resnick) 
"Bobby Jean"
"Trapped" (Jimmy Cliff)
"No Surrender"
"Waitin' on a Sunny Day"
"The Promised Land"
"Racing in the Street"
"Radio Nowhere"
"Lonesome Day"
"The Rising"
"Born to Run"
"Rosalita (Come Out Tonight)"
"Hard Times (Come Again No More)" (Stephen Foster)
"Jungleland"
"American Land"
"Glory Days" 
"Dancing in the Dark"

Personnel
As listed in the DVD liner notes:
Main performers
 Bruce Springsteen – guitar, lead vocals [also harmonica, played in performance but not listed]
 Roy Bittan – keyboards [also accordion]
 Clarence Clemons – saxophone, percussion, vocals [also harmonica and penny whistle]
 Nils Lofgren – guitar, vocals
 Garry Tallent – bass guitar
 Stevie Van Zandt – guitar, vocals [also mandolin]
 Max Weinberg – drums
Additional musicians
 Soozie Tyrell – violin, vocals [also acoustic guitar, mandolin, percussion]
 Charlie Giordano – accordion, piano, organ, vocals
 Curtis King Jr. – vocals, percussion
 Cindy Mizelle – vocals, percussion
 Brian Fallon – vocals
 Curt Ramm – trumpet on "Wrecking Ball"
Production
 Chris Hilson – directing
 Thom Zimny – directing on "Wrecking Ball", production, editing
 Bob Clearmountain – mixing
 Bob Ludwig – audio mastering
 Aaron Warren – production on "Wrecking Ball"

Charts

Certifications

References

Bruce Springsteen video albums
2010 live albums
Bruce Springsteen live albums
2010 video albums
Live video albums
2010s English-language films